Julien Loizillon (15 January 1829, in Paris – 3 May 1899, at Dammarie-lès-Lys), was a French general and politician.

He was Minister of War from  January 11, 1893 to April 3, 1893 in the government of Alexandre Ribot and from April 4, 1893 to December 3, 1893 in the government of Charles Dupuy

1829 births
1899 deaths
Politicians of the French Third Republic
Politicians from Paris
French generals
French Ministers of War